Chelojulidae is a family of millipedes belonging to the order Julida.

Genera:
 Chelojulus Enghoff, 1982

References

Julida